The 2015 U.S. Women's Open was the 70th U.S. Women's Open, held July 9–12 at Lancaster Country Club in Lancaster, Pennsylvania.

The U.S. Women's Open is the oldest of the five current major championships and the third of the 2015 season.

It had the largest purse in women's golf, at $4.5 million in 2015.  Additionally, the tournament set an attendance record for the U.S. Women's Open at 135,000 spectators for the week.

The tournament was televised by Fox Sports 1 and Fox Sports.

Qualifying and field
The championship is open to any female professional or amateur golfer with a USGA handicap index not exceeding 2.4. Players qualify by competing in one of twenty 36-hole qualifying tournaments held at sites across the United States and at international sites in China, England, Japan, and South Korea. Additional players were exempt from qualifying because of past performances in professional or amateur tournaments around the world.
 
The United States Golf Association received a record 1,873 entries for the championship.

Exempt from qualifying
Many players are exempt in multiple categories. Players are listed only once, in the first category in which they became exempt, with additional categories in parentheses next to their names. Golfers qualifying in Category 13 who qualified in other categories are denoted with the tour by which they qualified.

1. Winners of the U.S. Women's Open for the last ten years (2005–2014)
Na Yeon Choi (10,12,15,16), Paula Creamer (10,15,16), Eun-Hee Ji (10), Cristie Kerr (10,11,12,15,16), Birdie Kim, Inbee Park (5,7,10,11,12,15,16), So Yeon Ryu (9,10,12,15,16), Michelle Wie (9,10,15,16)
Exempt but did not enter tournament: Annika Sörenstam

2. Winner and runner-up from the 2014 U.S. Women's Amateur (must be an amateur)
Kristen Gillman
The runner-up, Brooke Henderson, turned professional in December 2014, forfeiting this exemption. She had previously qualified in category 9.

3. Winners of the 2014 and 2015 British Ladies Amateur Golf Championship (must be an amateur)
Céline Boutier (2015)
The 2014 winner, Emily Kristine Pedersen, was eligible but did not enter the tournament.

4. Winner of the 2014 Mark H. McCormack Medal (Women's World Amateur Golf Ranking) (must be an amateur)
Minjee Lee turned professional in December 2014, forfeiting her exemption from qualifying. She later qualified under categories 12 and 16.

5. Winners of the Women's PGA Championship for the last five years (2011–2015)
Shanshan Feng (10,12,15,16), Yani Tseng (6,10)

6. Winners of the Ricoh Women's British Open for the last five years (2010–2014)
Stacy Lewis (7,9,10,11,12,15,16), Mo Martin (10,12,15,16)
Jiyai Shin (13-JLPGA,15,16) qualified but did not enter the tournament

7. Winners of the ANA Inspiration for the last five years (2011–2015)
Brittany Lincicome (10,11,15,16), Lexi Thompson (9,10,15,16), Sun-Young Yoo (10)

8. Winners of the Evian Championship (2013–2014)
Kim Hyo-joo (11,12,13-KLPGA,15,16), Suzann Pettersen (10,15,16)

9. Ten lowest scorers and anyone tying for 10th place from the 2014 U.S. Women's Open
Brooke Henderson, Meena Lee (10), Catriona Matthew (10,15,16), Stephanie Meadow, Pornanong Phatlum (10,15,16), Jenny Shin (10,15,16), Amy Yang (10,11,12,15,16), Sakura Yokomine

10. Top 75 money leaders from the 2014 final official LPGA money list
Marina Alex, Dori Carter, Chella Choi (15,16), Carlota Ciganda (13-LET,15,16), Laura Davies, Laura Diaz, Austin Ernst (12), Jodi Ewart Shadoff, Sandra Gal (15,16), Julieta Granada (15,16), Mina Harigae, Caroline Hedwall, M. J. Hur (12), Karine Icher, Tiffany Joh, Moriya Jutanugarn, Danielle Kang, Haeji Kang, Kim Kaufman, Christina Kim (12), I.K. Kim (15), Katherine Kirk, Lydia Ko (11,12,15,16), Jessica Korda (15,16), Candie Kung, Brittany Lang (16), Ilhee Lee (15,16), Mi Hyang Lee (12,15,16), Mirim Lee (11,12,15,16), Amelia Lewis, Pernilla Lindberg, Caroline Masson, Sydnee Michaels, Belen Mozo, Azahara Muñoz (15,16), Haru Nomura, Anna Nordqvist (12,15,16), Ji Young Oh, Lee-Anne Pace (12,13-LET,15), Hee Young Park (15), Gerina Piller (15,16), Morgan Pressel (11,15,16), Beatriz Recari, Lizette Salas (15,16), Dewi Claire Schreefel, Sarah Jane Smith, Angela Stanford (15,16), Thidapa Suwannapura, Kris Tamulis, Ayako Uehara, Mariajo Uribe, Line Vedel, Karrie Webb (15,16)
Se Ri Pak withdrew from the tournament on June 21 and was replaced by Georgia Hall, the first alternate from the Buckinghamshire qualifier.
Jennifer Johnson withdrew on July 6 citing "medical reasons." She was replaced by Mallory Blackwelder, the first alternate from the Scottsdale, Arizona qualifier.

11. Top 10 money leaders from the 2015 official LPGA money list, through the close of entries on May 6
Kim Sei-young (12,15,16)

12. Winners of LPGA co-sponsored events, whose victories are considered official, from the conclusion of the 2014 U.S. Women's Open to the initiation of the 2015 U.S. Women's Open
Q Baek (13-KLPGA,15,16), Minjee Lee (16)

13. Top five money leaders from the 2014 Japan LPGA Tour, Korea LPGA Tour and Ladies European TourJapan LPGA Tour: Teresa Lu (15,16), Misuzu NaritaKorea LPGA Tour: Heo Yoon-kyung (15), Lee Jung-min (15,16), Chun In-gee (15,16)Ladies European Tour: Charley Hull (15,16), Gwladys NoceraSun-Ju Ahn (15,16) (JLPGA), Lee Bo-mee (15,16) (JLPGA) and Nikki Campbell (LET) qualified but did not enter the tournament.Heo Yoon-kyung (15) qualified but withdrew from the tournament on July 8 with a knee injury. She was replaced by Ally McDonald, the first alternate from the Atlanta, Georgia qualifier.14. Top three money leaders from the 2014 China LPGA Tour.
Xi Yu Lin, Babe Liu, Yanhong Pan

15. Top 50 point leaders from the current Rolex Rankings and anyone tying for 50th place as of May 6, 2015
Jang Ha-na (16), Ariya JutanugarnKim Min-sun (16) and Ko Jin-young (16) qualified but did not enter the tournament.16. Top 50 point leaders from the current Rolex Rankings and anyone tying for 50th place as of July 5, 2015
Shiho OyamaMomoko Ueda qualified but did not enter the tournament.17. Special exemptions selected by the USGANone offered.Qualifiers
Additional players qualify through sectional qualifying tournaments taking place between May 9 and June 15 at 25 sites in the United States, China, South Korea, England, and Japan.

(a) denotes amateur

May 9 at Ka’anapali Golf Resort (Royal Course), Lahaina, Hawaii
Mariel Galdiano (a)

May 13 at CGA Nanshan International Training Center (Garden Course), Shandong, China
Yuting Shi

May 18 at Serrano Country Club, El Dorado Hills, California
Jennifer Coleman, Beth Lillie (a)

May 18 at Bradenton Country Club, Bradenton, Florida
Daniela Darquea (a), Regina Plasencia (a)

May 18 at Druid Hills Golf Club, Atlanta, Georgia
Brooke Pancake, Jane Park

May 18 at Westmoreland Country Club, Wilmette, Illinois
Christina Foster (a), Elizabeth Nagel

May 18 at Windsong Farm Golf Club, Independence, Minnesota
Sarah Burnham (a)

May 18 at Butler Country Club, Butler, Pennsylvania
Lori Adams (a), Nikolette Schroeder (a)

May 18 at Hermitage Country Club, Manakin-Sabot, Virginia
Alejandra Llaneza, Mika Miyazato, Jennifer Song

May 18 at Woo Jeong Hills Country Club, Chungnam, South Korea
So-Young Lee (a), Min Gyeong Youn (a)

May 19 at Superstition Mountain Golf & Country Club, Gold Canyon, Arizona
Jimin Kang, Lindsey Weaver (a)

May 19 at Goose Creek Golf Club, Mira Loma, California
Alison Lee, Lilia Khatu Vu (a)

May 22 at Fountains Country Club (North Course), Lake Worth, Florida
Wei-Ling Hsu, Ryann O'Toole

May 25 at Buckinghamshire Golf Club, Buckinghamshire, England
Holly Aitchison, Maria Balikoeva, Heather Macrae, Lauren Taylor, Kylie Walker

May 26 at Industry Hills Golf Club, City of Industry, California
Lee Lopez, Angella Then (a)

May 27 at Riverdale Golf Course, Brighton, Colorado
Bertine Strauss (a), María Fassi (a)

May 27 at Governors Club, Chapel Hill, North Carolina
Lauren Doughtie, Su-Hyun Oh

May 29 at Sugar Mill Country Club (White/Red Course), New Smyrna Beach, Florida
Haley Italia, Haruka Morita-WanyaoLu

June 1 at Galloway National Golf Club, Galloway, New Jersey
Natalie Gulbis, Nontoya Srisawang

June 2 at Ferncroft Country Club, Middleton, Massachusetts
Stephanie Connelly, Megan Khang (a)

June 2 at St. Clair Country Club, Belleville, Illinois
Breanna Elliott, Emma Talley (a)

June 2 at OGA Golf Course, Woodburn, Oregon
Muni He (a), Hannah O'Sullivan (a)

June 2 at The Woodlands Country Club (Player Course), The Woodlands, Texas
Christel Boeljon, Gaby López (a)

June 4 at Lakewood Country Club, Dallas, Texas
Dylan Kim (a), Jennifer Park (a)

June 15 at Arima Royal Golf Club, Hyōgo Prefecture, Japan
Lala Anai, Erika Kikuchi, Ayaka Matsumori, Ai Suzuki, Suzuka Yamaguchi (a), Rumi Yoshiba

Alternates added to field
The following players were added to the field before the start of the tournament when spots reserved for exemptions in various categories were not used and to replace players who withdrew from the tournament.

Mallory Blackwelder, Jaye Marie Green, Georgia Hall, Min Lee, Nikki Long (a), Ally McDonald, Samantha Wagner

Nationalities in the field

Past champions in the field

Made the cut

Missed the cut

Course layout

Source:

Round summaries

First roundThursday and Friday, July 9–10, 2015The first round was incomplete Thursday due to weather; play was completed on Friday morning before the beginning of the second round.

Second roundFriday, July 10, 2015Third roundSaturday, July 11, 2015Final roundSunday, July 12, 2015ScorecardFinal roundCumulative tournament scores, relative to par''
Source:

References

External links

2015 U.S. Women's Open at LPGA official site

U.S. Women's Open
Golf in Pennsylvania
Sports competitions in Pennsylvania
Sports in Lancaster, Pennsylvania
Women's sports in Pennsylvania
U.S. Women's Open
U.S. Women's Open
U.S. Women's Open
U.S. Women's Open